Nuss may refer to:

 Nuss procedure, a minimally invasive procedure, invented by Dr. Donald Nuss for treating pectus excavatum
 Bobby Nuss Stadium, Chalmette High School's football stadium in Chalmette, in unincorporated St. Bernard Parish, Louisiana
 National Union of School Students (NUSS) in England
 National University of Singapore Society
 William J. Nuss (1914-1991), American politician and lawyer

See also 
 Nusse, a village in the district of Lauenburg, in Schleswig-Holstein, Germany